Domenico Maria Manni (8 April 1690 – 30 November 1788) was an Italian polymath, editor, and publisher. He was born to father who was a typesetter at a printer's shop. Domenico Maria became a member of the Accademia della Crusca, and librarian for the Strozzi collection, and is known for his zealous drive to edit and publish works on a very wide diversity of subjects.

Works 

 Serie dei senatori fiorentini (1722)
 Cronica di Firenze di Donato Velluti, dall’anno 1300, in circa, fino al 1370, Florence, 1731 (on-line)
 Lezioni di lingua toscana, by Domenico Maria Manni, Florentine academic in the Archbishop's Seminary of Florence,: Published by Pietro Gaetano Viviani, Florence, 1737 with dedications to the Duke of Savoy and the Florentine bishop, Giuseppe Maria Martelli.
 Degli occhiali da naso inventati da Salvino Armati, Firenze: Antonio Maria Albizzini, 1738
 Osservazioni istoriche sopra i sigilli antichi de' secoli bassi, 37 voll., 1739-86.
 
 Istoria del Decamerone di Giovanni Boccaccio, Florence, 1742 (on-line)
 Istoria degli anni santi. Florence: G. Battista Stecchi, 1750 (on-line)
 Notizie de' professori del disegno da Cimabue in qua, Opere di Filippo Baldinucci, Florence: per Gio. Batista Stecchi e Anton Giuseppe Pagani, 1767-1774
 Opere di Messer Agnolo Firenzuola fiorentino, Milan: Società tipografica de' Classici italiani, 1802
 Trattato di Piero Vettori delle lodi e della coltivazione degli ulivi nuova accuratissima edizione presa da quella del 1720. citata dagli Accademici della Crusca. Colle annotazioni del dott. Giuseppe Bianchini di Prato e di Domenico M. Manni. Florence: nella stamperia di Gio. Batista Stecchi alla Condotta, 1762
 Notizie istoriche intorno al Parlagio ovvero anfiteatro di Firenze. Bologna: Tommaso Colli, 1746
 Le veglie piacevoli ovvero notizie de' più bizzarri e giocondi uomini toscani le quali possono servire da utile trattenimento, scritte da Domenico M. Manni. Tomo I-VIII. In Venice: presso Antonio Zatta, 1759-1760

References

External links 
 

1690 births
1788 deaths
Grammarians from Italy
18th-century Italian writers
18th-century Italian male writers
Italian publishers (people)